Sog County, Sogxian, or Suoxian is a county under the administration of the prefecture-level city of Nagqu of the Tibet Autonomous Region.

Geography
Sog Dzong lies in the extreme western part of the former province of  Kham. To its west is Chamdo and to its right Nagchu. Sogdzong is located between the Drachen and Driru, on the Sogchu River. It is the source of Gyalmo Ngulchu.

Climate
Sog County has a dry-winter alpine subarctic climate (Köppen Dwc) with mild, rainy summers and freezing to frigid, dry winters with large diurnal temperature variations.

Economy
Crops include barley, wheat, radish, potatoes, etc. and yaks, sheep, goat, cows, and horses are reared. Nomads move four times annually according to seasons.
The county contains Tsangdain Monastery, built in 1667, resembling the Potala Palace.

References

Transport 
China National Highway 317

External links
Images

Counties of Tibet
Nagqu